Sericophanes is a genus of plant bugs in the family Miridae. There are more than 20 described species in Sericophanes.

Species
These 23 species belong to the genus Sericophanes:

 Sericophanes albomaculatus Knight, 1930
 Sericophanes bolivariensis Carvalho & Costa, 1988
 Sericophanes clarus Carvalho & Carpintero, 1992
 Sericophanes floridanus Knight, 1927
 Sericophanes fuscicornis Knight, 1968
 Sericophanes fuscus Maldonado, 1970
 Sericophanes heidemanni Poppius, 1914
 Sericophanes nevadensis Knight, 1968
 Sericophanes niger Poppius, 1921
 Sericophanes nigripes Maldonado, 1970
 Sericophanes obscuricornis Poppius, 1921
 Sericophanes ocellatus Reuter, 1876
 Sericophanes ornatus (Berg, 1878)
 Sericophanes oscurus Maldonado, 1970
 Sericophanes panamensis Carvalho, 1955
 Sericophanes parviceps Poppius, 1914
 Sericophanes pulidoi Maldonado, 1970
 Sericophanes rubripes Knight, 1968
 Sericophanes scotti (Berg, 1883)
 Sericophanes sulinus Carvalho & Wallerstein, 1978
 Sericophanes tigrensis Carvalho & Costa, 1988
 Sericophanes triangularis Knight, 1918
 Sericophanes tumidifrons Knight, 1968

References

Further reading

 
 
 
 

Miridae genera
Articles created by Qbugbot
Orthotylini